Hollywood Plaza Hotel was a 200-room hotel located at 1633–37 North Vine Street in Hollywood, California, just south of the famous intersection of Hollywood and Vine. It is in close proximity to the Capitol Records Building. Opened on October 15, 1925, it was a popular venue for film, radio, and theatre stars of the 1930s, 1940s, and 1950s. It was converted into a retirement home in the 1970s.

History
The site was previously occupied by the residence of Jacob Stern. Joseph Stern, the hotel owner, leased the hotel to the Vine Street Hotel and Investment Company, led by Harold Stern.

Description
Designed by Walker & Eisen in Renaissance Revival style, the hotel was built in 1924 at a cost of US$1 million. The plan was T-shaped and 10 stories in height, of reinforced concrete, ornamental plaster, and stone. There were two garden plazas and a street-level ballroom. The name "Plaza" appeared on a large neon signboard atop the roof.

The lobby, which was modernized after World War II, originally featured an Italian-style coffered ceiling and bronze chandeliers.

The hotel's "Russian Eagle" nightclub was renamed the "It Cafe" by Clara Bow and her husband, Rex Bell, in 1937. Though Bow promised to appear three times a week at the cafe, her interest gradually waned and the cafe closed in 1943. It later became a coffee shop. The hotel featured vaudeville acts, and during the 1950s, the television game show Queen for a Day set up a live remote broadcast location in the ballroom. Disc jockey Johnny Grant broadcast his daily show from the Hollywood Plaza Bar.

Clientele
Being located in the vicinity of many broadcast studios, the hotel was popular with radio performers and live theatre actors visiting Los Angeles, including Jackie Gleason, Doris Day, Marilyn Monroe, and Edward Everett Horton, as well as top bandleaders like Harry James, Paul Whiteman, and Hal McIntyre. Bette Davis resided in the hotel with her mother when she arrived in Hollywood in 1930. A fresh contract in hand, Ava Gardner checked into the Hollywood Plaza in 1941, but was forced to move to the cheaper Wilcox Hotel. In the 1940s and 1950s, a barber shop in the basement was frequented by singer Frank Sinatra, who enjoyed playing gin rummy with the barber. Comedian George Burns maintained an office at the top of the hotel in the late 1930s.

The silhouette of a hotel seen from the window of Lucy Ricardo's flat in several I Love Lucy episodes is that of the Hollywood Plaza.

Notoriety
The hotel had its share of notoriety. In 1937 Ern Westmore, released from detainment for a drunk-driving charge, checked into a 10th-floor room and threatened to leap out the window; his brother Frank came to calm him down. That same year, an airline stewardess was found dead in her room. In 1954, an Alaskan woman indicted for the murder of her husband and released on bail committed suicide in her room with an overdose of sleeping pills. In 1959 a woman survived an 8-story fall down the hotel's stairwell.

Present day
By the early 1970s, the hotel had become derelict. The building was converted into a retirement home. Original palm trees occupy the rear of the building.

The building and its neon signboard were designated Los Angeles Historic-Cultural Monument No. 665 on September 29, 1999.

References

Bibliography

External links
History at Paradiseleased.wordpress.com

1925 establishments in California
Buildings and structures in Hollywood, Los Angeles
Hotel buildings completed in 1925
Hotels in Los Angeles
Los Angeles Historic-Cultural Monuments
Defunct hotels in Los Angeles